The French House or French House may refer to:

Public housing in France

in the United Kingdom:
 The French House in Dean Street, Soho, London

in the United States:
(by state, then city/town)
Looney–French House, Dalton, Arkansas, listed on the National Register of Historic Places (NRHP) in Randolph County
French–England House, Little Rock, Arkansas, listed on the NRHP in Pulaski County
Porter–French House, Orange, California, listed on the NRHP in Orange County
 The French House, a student residence at Wesleyan University, Middletown, Connecticut
Seth French House, Orange City, Florida, listed on the NRHP in Volusia County
Henry French House, Jeffersonville, Indiana, listed on the NRHP in Indiana
The French House (Vincennes, Indiana), see List of the oldest buildings in Indiana
Alice French House (Davenport, Iowa), listed on the NRHP in Scott County
Charles & Elizabeth Haskell French House, Lawrence, Kansas, listed on the NRHP in Douglas County
Simon French House, Hensleytown, Kentucky, listed on the NRHP in Christian County
The French House (Baton Rouge, Louisiana), listed on the NRHP in East Baton Rouge Parish
Pillsbury–French House, Andover, Massachusetts, listed on the NRHP in Essex County
Holyoke–French House, Boxford, Massachusetts, listed on the NRHP in Essex County
Valentine–French House, Fall River, Massachusetts, listed on the NRHP in Bristol County
French–Andrews House, Topsfield, Massachusetts, listed on the NRHP in Essex County
Adams–French House, Aberdeen, Mississippi, listed on the NRHP in Monroe County
Thomas French Jr. House, Moorestown, New Jersey, listed on the NRHP in Burlington County
 The French House at New York University, a cultural and events center, New York City
Garnet B. French House, Canton, Ohio, listed on the NRHP in Stark County
French–Parks House, Tahlequah, Oklahoma, listed on the NRHP in Cherokee County
Edward French House, The Dalles, Oregon, listed on the NRHP in Wasco County
French House, Austin, Texas, a cooperative house administered by University of Texas Inter-Cooperative Council 
The French House at the University of Virginia, a student residence, Charlottesville, Virginia
Col. William Henderson French House, Athens, West Virginia, listed on the NRHP in Mercer County
Teter Myers French House, Hedgesville, West Virginia, listed on the NRHP in Berkeley County
The French House at the University of Wisconsin–Madison, a student residence and cultural center